This is a list of qualifying teams for the 2017 NCAA Division I men's basketball tournament. A total of 68 teams participated in the tournament. Thirty-two of the teams earned automatic bids by winning their conference tournaments. The remaining 36 teams were granted at-large bids, which were extended by the NCAA Selection Committee. All teams were seeded 1 to 16 within their regionals, while the Selection Committee seeded the entire field from 1 to 68.

Qualifying teams

Automatic bids
Seeds listed were seeds within the conference tournaments. Conference championship runners-up in bold face were given at-large berths.

Conferences with multiple bids

Bids by state

References

NCAA Division I men's basketball tournament qualifying teams
 
qualifying teams